Eremophyton is a genus of flowering plants belonging to the family Brassicaceae.

Its native range is Northern Sahara.

Species:
 Eremophyton chevallieri (Barratte) Bég.

References

Brassicaceae
Brassicaceae genera